Jeff Bradley (born May 29, 1961) is an American former professional racing cyclist. He rode in the 1987 Tour de France.

References

External links
 

1961 births
Living people
American male cyclists
Sportspeople from Alabama